Bounphachan Bounkong (Lao: ບຸນພະຈັນ ບຸນກອງ; born 29 November 2000) is a Laotian professional footballer who is currently playing as a winger for the Young Elephants in the Lao League 1.

Career statistics

International

International goals
Scores and results list Laos' goal tally first.

References

External links

2000 births
Living people
Laotian footballers
Laos international footballers
Association football midfielders
Association football forwards
People from Savannakhet province
Competitors at the 2019 Southeast Asian Games
Competitors at the 2021 Southeast Asian Games
Southeast Asian Games competitors for Laos